Spencer Brown, also known as Spencer YokkaoSaenchaiGym, is a Scottish super lightweight Muay Thai kickboxer currently fighting out of YOKKAO Training Center Bangkok in Thailand. He is a WBC Muay Thai European champion.

Biography 
Spencer Brown was born in Irvine, North Ayrshire, Scotland on 24 July 1997. His passion for martial arts began at the age of 6 when he trained and competed in Karate at the national level. When he was 15 years old, he started training in Muay Thai at the Rama Camp Gym after a friend introduced him to the sport.

In 2015, Brown was scouted by Yokkao UK promoter, Brian Calder and was given the opportunity to fight on the Yokkao 12 - 13 undercard.

The following year in 2016, Brown was signed on as a Yokkao Next Generation fighter. He moved to Bangkok on the invitation of Yokkao the same year, joining the Yokkao Training Center and training alongside Saenchai, Singdam, Manachai and Yodchai.

In September 2017, Brown officially joined the YOKKAO Fight Team, and made his debut on the official Yokkao event at YOKKAO 25 in Hong Kong.

In May 2017, Brown fought against Miguel Martinez in Spain for the ISKA European championship title. Brown won the fight via decision.

On 26 January 2019, Brown won the WBC Super-Lightweight European title against Italian fighter, Luca Roma at Yokkao 35 in Turin, Italy.

Titles and accomplishments

 2017 ISKA European Champion
 2019 WBC Muay Thai European Super-Lightweight Champion

Muay Thai record

Legend:

References

Living people
Scottish male kickboxers
Scottish Muay Thai practitioners
Male Muay Thai practitioners
1997 births